Daniel Alomía Robles District or Pumahuasi District is one of six districts of the province Leoncio Prado in Peru. Its seat is the town of Pumahuasi.

References